John Stone (born 1958) is an Irish former hurler. At club level he played with Roscrea and was also a member of the Tipperary senior hurling team.

Career

Stone first played hurling at juvenile and underage levels with the Roscrea club. He was part of the club's minor team that won three consecutive North Tipperary MHC titles from 1974 to 1976. Stone progressed onto the senior team and was at left wing-forward when Roscrea beat Kilruane MacDonaghs in the 1980 final.

Stone first appeared on the inter-county scene as a member of the Tipperary minor hurling team. He was at full-forward when Tipperary beat Kilkenny by 16 points in the 1976 All-Ireland minor final. Stone later won consecutive All-Ireland U21HC titles with the Tipperary under-21 team in 1978 and 1979. He joined the senior team for the 1980-81 season.

Honours

Roscrea
Tipperary Senior Hurling Championship: 1980
North Tipperary Senior Hurling Championship: 1980, 1982

Tipperary
All-Ireland Under-21 Hurling Championship: 1978, 1979
Munster Under-21 Hurling Championship: 1978, 1979
All-Ireland Minor Hurling Championship: 1976
Munster Minor Hurling Championship: 1976

References

External link
John Stone player profile

1958 births
Living people
Roscrea hurlers
Tipperary inter-county hurlers